Sarah Dunn (born 1970) is an American author and television writer. She is known for her novels The Big Love and Secrets to Happiness, and the ABC sitcom American Housewife, starring Katy Mixon.

Life and career 
After graduating from the University of Pennsylvania, Dunn spent several years working service jobs in Philadelphia, Pennsylvania, the experience of which informed her first book, The Official Slacker Handbook. Shortly afterward, she moved to Los Angeles, California, where she wrote for television series including Murphy Brown, Veronica's Closet, Spin City, and Bunheads. With Spin City co-creator Bill Lawrence, Dunn penned Michael J. Fox's final episode of the series.

Dunn is also a novelist whose works include The Big Love (2005), Secrets to Happiness (2009), and The Arrangement (2017). Her books have been translated into 19 different languages .

Dunn is a member of the all-female television writers group “The Ladies Room”, which also includes Vanessa McCarthy, Stephanie Birkitt, and Julie Bean. The group was founded in July 2016.

In November 2020, it was announced that, after an "extensive" HR investigation that took place between the fourth and fifth seasons of American Housewife following allegations of a toxic workplace made by Carly Hughes, Dunn would no longer have an active producing role in the series.

Family 
Dunn is married to former New York Observer executive editor Peter Stevenson. They married in 2007.

Selected works 
 The Official Slacker Handbook, 1994. 
 The Big Love, 2005.
 Secrets to Happiness, 2009.
 The Arrangement, 2017

References

External links 
 Review of Secrets to Happiness in the New York Times.
 Review of The Big Love in USA Today.
 "A Barn of One's Own" - Sarah's writing space profiled in Upstate House. 
 

1975 births
Living people
American television writers
American television producers
American women television producers
University of Pennsylvania alumni
American women television writers
20th-century American screenwriters
21st-century American screenwriters
20th-century American women writers
21st-century American women writers
21st-century American novelists
American women novelists